This is the list of episodes of the American live-action/animated anthology comedy television series Toon In with Me. The show premiered on January 1, 2021, on MeTV. Most shorts featured are from the Golden Age of American animation (mainly 1930s-1960s), though some from the 1970s to 2000s have also been included.

Series overview

Episodes

2021

2022

2023

References

External links
 
 

Toon In with Me